Kreisky is a surname. Notable people with the surname include:
 Jakob Kreisky ∞ Hanna Bacher
 Bernhard Kreisky ∞ Rosa Blumel
 Benedikt Kreisky ∞ Katharina Neuwirth
 Max (Marcus) Kreisky (1876, Klatovy – 1944, Stockholm) ∞ Irene née Felix (1885, Třebíč – 1969, Vienna)
 Paul Kreisky (1909?)
  (1911, Margareten–1990, Hietzing), Chancellor of Austria ∞ Vera Alice Fürth (1916, Stockholm1988), daughter of Theodor Fürth (1881, 1951)
  (1944, Stockholm2010, Calvià, Mallorca), Austrian sociologist, son of Bruno
 Jan Daniel Kreisky
 Suzanne Dorau
 Oliver Dorau
  née Zgraja (born 1944), Austrian political scientist and jurist, wife of Peter

References 

 Kreisky Family Genealogy

See also 
 

Slavic-language surnames
Surnames of Czech origin
Jewish surnames
Austrian families
Czech families